Twin Lakes are a pair of small sub-alpine lakes in the Axolotl Lakes group in the Greenhorn Range southwest of Ennis, Montana. Twin Lakes is located on state owned land and accessible by a one-lane dirt road (Axolotl Lakes Road) connecting Montana Highway 287 and the Gravelly Range road.

Twin Lakes contain rainbow trout stocked by the Montana Department of Fish, Wildlife and Parks.

See also
 List of lakes in Madison County, Montana

Notes

Lakes of Montana
Lakes of Madison County, Montana